James Ray may refer to:
James Arthur Ray (born 1957), American professional speaker and author convicted of negligent homicide in 2011
James B. Ray (1794–1848), governor of Indiana
James Davis Ray Jr. (1918–1990), American botanist
James Earl Ray (1928–1998), assassin of Martin Luther King Jr.
James Edwin Ray (born 1941), U.S. Air Force fighter pilot and Vietnam-era prisoner-of-war
James Enos Ray Jr. (1874–1934), American politician
James Ray (rock musician), founding member of James Ray And The Performance, James Ray's Gangwar, The MK Ultra, and his current band 4080peru
James Ray (singer) (1941–c. 1963), R&B singer in the early 1960s
James Ray (basketball) (born 1957), American basketball player
James Ray (historian), English historian
Jim Ray (1944–2005), American baseball player
Jim Ray (basketball) (born 1934), American basketball player
Jimmy Ray (born 1970), English musician

See also
James Rae (disambiguation)
Jimmy Rayl (1941–2019), American basketball player